Lauri Viljanen (1900, Kaarina, Southwest Finland – 1984) was a Finnish literary critic and writer.

He was the leading critic of the literary group Tulenkantajat (The Flame Bearers) during the 1930s and 1940s.

Published works
Auringon purjeet, poetry collection.  1924
Hurmioituneet kasvot, poetry collection. 1925 (anthology)
Tähtikeinu, poetry collection. 1926
Merkkivaloja. 1929
Musta runotar, poetry collection.  1932
V.A.Koskenniemi.  1935
Taisteleva humanismi, essay collection.  1936
Näköala vuorelta, poetry collection. 1936
Atlantis, poetry collection. 1940
Sotatalvi.  1941 (anthology)
Illan ja aamun välillä, essey collection. 1941
Runeberg ja hänen runoutensa I–III. 1944–1948
Tuuli ja ihminen, poem collection. 1945
Kootut runot.  1946
Venäjän runotar. 1949 (co-editor)
Aleksis Kiven runomaailma. 1953
Aleksis Kiven kootut runot. 1954 (editor)
Hansikas ja muita kirjallisuustutkielmia. 1955
Seitsemän elegiaa, poetry collection. 1957
Valikoima runoja.  1958
Lyyrillinen minä ja muita kirjallisuustutkielmia. 1959
Henrik Ibsen. 1962
Suomen kirjallisuus III. 1963 (editor)
Ajan ulottuvuudet.  1974
Kansojen kirjallisuus. 1974–1978 (co-editor)

1900 births
1984 deaths
People from Kaarina
Writers from Southwest Finland
Finnish writers
Finnish literary critics
Finnish theatre critics